Vanderburgh County is a county in the U.S. state of Indiana. As of 2010, the population was 179,703. The county seat is in Evansville. While Vanderburgh County was the seventh-largest county in 2010 population with 179,703 people, it is also the eighth-smallest county in area in Indiana and the smallest in southwestern Indiana, covering only . In 2019, the population was 181,451.

Vanderburgh County forms the core of the Evansville metropolitan statistical area.

History
Vanderburgh County was formed on January 7, 1818, from Gibson, Posey, and Warrick counties. It was named for Captain Henry Vanderburgh, Revolutionary War veteran and judge for the Indiana Territory.

Geography

Regional
 Illinois–Indiana–Kentucky tri-state area
 Southwestern Indiana

Adjacent counties

Cities and towns

Census-designated places

Unincorporated towns

Townships
(2000 Population)

Major highways

Climate and weather 

Government
The county government is a constitutional body, and is granted specific powers by the Constitution of Indiana, and by the Indiana Code.

County Council: The county council is the fiscal branch of the county government that has the legislative responsibilities for the spending and revenue collection in the county. Four representatives are elected from county districts and three are elected at-large by the entire county. The council members serve four-year terms. They are responsible for setting salaries, the annual budget, and special spending. The council also has limited authority to impose local taxes, in the form of an income and property tax that is subject to state level approval, excise taxes, and service taxes.

Board of Commissioners: The executive body of the county is made of a board of commissioners. The commissioners are elected county-wide but must live within the district of the seat they hold, in staggered terms, and each serves a four-year term. One of the commissioners, typically the most senior, serves as president. The commissioners are charged with executing the acts legislated by the council, collecting revenue, and managing the day-to-day functions of the county government.

Court: The county has eight state trial courts of original jurisdiction. One circuit court and seven superior courts. The judges offices are non-partisan with terms of six years. A judge must be a member of the Indiana Bar Association. The judges are assisted by magistrates that are appointed. circuit court.

County Officials: The county has several other elected offices, including sheriff, coroner, auditor, treasurer, recorder, surveyor, and circuit court clerk. Each of these elected officers serves a term of four years and oversees a different part of county government. Members elected to county government positions are required to declare party affiliations and to be residents of the county.

Vanderburgh County is generally a Republican-leaning swing county in presidential elections. Only two Democratic candidates - George McGovern in 1972 and Hillary Clinton in 2016 - have failed to won 40 percent of the county's vote since 1928. The city of Evansville itself is a swing city; it voted for Donald Trump in 2016 by 4 points, and four years later for Joe Biden, also by 4 points. In 2020, former Evansville mayor Jonathan Weinzapfel (a Democrat) carried the county in his bid for the office of Attorney General but lost statewide.

The county is located in the 8th congressional district, which was notoriously dubbed "The Bloody Eighth" because of its tendency to oust incumbents from both parties - since 1933, no Congressman has represented the district longer than 12 years in a row.

Demographics

As of the 2010 United States Census, there were 179,703 people, 74,454 households, and 45,118 families residing in the county. The racial makeup of the county was 86.2% white, 9.1% black or African American, 1.1% Asian, 0.2% American Indian, 0.1% Pacific islander, 1.0% from other races, and 2.3% from two or more races. Those of Hispanic or Latino origin made up 2.2% of the population. In terms of ancestry, 32.3% were German, 18.3% were American, 11.7% were Irish, and 9.4% were English.

Of the 74,454 households, 28.9% had children under the age of 18 living with them, 42.9% were married couples living together, 13.1% had a female householder with no husband present, 39.4% were non-families, and 32.3% of all households were made up of individuals. The average household size was 2.31 and the average family size was 2.93. The median age was 37.5 years.

The median income for a household in the county was $47,697 and the median income for a family was $57,076. Males had a median income of $42,663 versus $31,037 for females. The per capita income for the county was $23,945. About 10.7% of families and 15.6% of the population were below the poverty line, including 22.4% of those under age 18 and 7.7% of those age 65 or over.

Education
The entire county is in the Evansville-Vanderburgh School Corporation.

See also
 National Register of Historic Places listings in Vanderburgh County, Indiana

References

External links
 
 Official Vanderburgh County Website 

 
Indiana counties
1818 establishments in Indiana
Populated places established in 1818
Southwestern Indiana
Indiana counties on the Ohio River
Evansville metropolitan area